Andrew Airport  was located  northwest of Andrew, Alberta, Canada. The airport is permanently closed.

References

External links
Place to Fly on COPA's Places to Fly airport directory

Defunct airports in Alberta
Lamont County